Craig Ritter (born November 10, 1970, in Anaheim Hills, California) is a former American football lineman. He played college football for the Arizona State Sun Devils (1991–92) and signed as a free agent professionally for the Houston Oilers (1993), Los Angeles Raiders (1994), Denver Broncos (1994) in the National Football League. He played with the London Monarchs (1995–96) and the Frankfurt Galaxy (1996) in the World League of American Football, the Memphis Maddogs (1995) in Canadian Football League, the Arizona Rattlers (1997–1998) in the Arena Football League and the New Orleans Thunder (1999) in the Regional Football League.

External links
The Football Database
Continuum Wealth Management

1970 births
Living people
Players of American football from Anaheim, California
American football defensive linemen
American football offensive linemen
Arizona State Sun Devils football players
London Monarchs players
Frankfurt Galaxy players
Arizona Rattlers players
People from Anaheim Hills, California